Cankles may refer to:

 Cankle, an anatomical feature of some human body types
 "Cankles" (Weeds), an episode of the American TV series
 Kanklės, a Lithuanian musical instrument